is a video game developed by Argent and released by Sony for the PlayStation. Players manage different types of restaurants, using the controller's analog sticks to perform various tasks.

It was published in Japan on September 9, 1999. Due to its success, it was re-released under the PlayStation's 'The Best' label. A one-level demo was made available in the US via PlayStation Underground.

A semi-sequel party game, Gacharoku, was released on the PlayStation 2.

The game inspired the 2004 fan-made remake Ore No Ryomi for English-speaking audiences, and its sequel Ore No Ryomi 2, both of which were released for free. These ultimately spawned the commercial sequel Ore No Ryomi 3, which was re-titled and sold as Cook, Serve, Delicious!, independently released for PC and Mac through Steam in 2012.

Reception
On release, Famitsu magazine scored the game a 32 out of 40.

References

External links
 
 

1999 video games
Japan-exclusive video games
PlayStation (console) games
PlayStation (console)-only games
PlayStation Network games
Cooking video games
Video games developed in Japan
Single-player video games